The Phil Kaufman Award was established in 1994 by the EDA Consortium (now the Electronic System Design Alliance, a SEMI Technology Community)  to recognize individuals for their impact on electronic design by their contributions to electronic design automation (EDA). The IEEE Council on Electronic Design Automation (CEDA) became a co-sponsor in 2006. The award has been dubbed "The Nobel Prize of the EDA Industry".

Contributions are evaluated in any of the following categories:

 Business
 Industry Direction and Promotion
 Technology and Engineering
 Educational and Mentoring

The award was established to honor Phil Kaufman, the deceased former president of Quickturn Systems.

Recipients
All recipients are listed at the ESDA Phil Kaufman Award webpage.
 2022: Giovanni De Micheli, for his significant impact on the electronic system design industry through pioneering technical contributions. 
 2021: Anirudh Devgan, Cadence Design Systems CEO for Distinguished Contributions to Electronic System Design.
 2020: Hiatus due to COVID-19 pandemic
 2019: Mary Jane Irwin, Pennsylvania State University, for her extensive contributions to EDA and the community.
 2018: Thomas Williams, for his outstanding contributions to test automation and his overall impact on the electronics industry.
 2017: Rob Rutenbar, for his contributions to algorithms and tools for analog and mixed-signal designs. 
 2016: Andrzej Strojwas, CMU professor and chief technologist of PDF Solutions, for his research in the area of design for manufacturing in the semiconductor industry.
 2015: Walden C. Rhines, CEO of Mentor Graphics, for his efforts growing the EDA and IC design industries.
 2014: Lucio Lanza, for helping numerous startups to develop innovative technologies.
 2013: Chenming Hu, for major contributions to transistor modeling enabling the generation of FinFET based design.
 2011: Chung Laung Liu, for his Distinguished Technical Contributions, Leadership Skills, and Business Acumen in Electronic Design Automation.
 2010: Pat Pistilli, for pioneering the EDA industry and building the Design Automation Conference as its premiere showcase and networking platform
 2009: Randal Bryant, CMU professor, for his seminal technological breakthroughs in the area of formal verification.
 2008: Aart de Geus, Synopsys CEO for contributions to the EDA industry, more specifically the Design Compiler tool.
 2007: Robert K. Brayton, known for work in logic synthesis, formal verification and formal equivalence checking.  Co-developer of Espresso.
 2006: Robert Dutton, creator of SUPREM (Stanford University Process Engineering Models) and PISCES (Poisson and Continuity Equation Solver) simulation tools and software used in Technology Computer Aided Design.
 2005: Phil Moorby, inventor of Verilog
 2004: Joseph Costello
 2003: A. Richard Newton
 2002: Ronald A. Rohrer, electronic industry pioneer, entrepreneur, researcher and educator, who head led a students' circuit simulator projects, which had eventually led to the development of SPICE. 
 2001: Alberto Sangiovanni-Vincentelli
 2000: Paul (Yen-Son) Huang
 1999: Hugo De Man, known for his contributions in creating and driving the development of design automation tools that have had measurable impact on the productivity of electronic design engineers.
 1998: Ernest S. Kuh
 1997: James Solomon
 1996: Carver Mead
 1995: Donald Pederson
 1994: Hermann Gummel

See also

 List of computer-related awards
 List of engineering awards

References

External links
 ESD Alliance
 IEEE Council on EDA

Design awards
Computer-related awards
Electrical and electronic engineering awards